Parejo is a Spanish surname. Notable people with the surname include:

Ángeles Parejo (born 1969), former Spanish footballer
Dani Parejo (born 1989), Spanish footballer
Enrique Parejo González (born 1930), Colombian politician
Iván Parejo (born 1987), Spanish aerobic gymnast
Jacinta Parejo (1845–1914), First Lady of Venezuela
Jesús Parejo (born 1981), former Venezuelan track and field athlete
José Raúl Gutiérrez Parejo (born 1996), Spanish footballer
Marcial Gómez Parejo (1930-2012), Spanish painter and illustrator
Martín Parejo Maza (born 1989), Spanish athlete
Víctor Manuel Cámara Parejo (born 1959), Venezuelan telenovela and cinema actor
Yonfrez Parejo (born 1986), Venezuelan professional boxer

Spanish-language surnames